Mike Tooby (born 20 December 1956) is an independent curator and researcher based in Cardiff, Wales. His interests lie in integrating the practices often separated in curating in the arts and heritage settings: research, display, promotion, participation and learning. His own practice centres on curating in collaborative or site-specific contexts, where negotiating and celebrating relationships with audiences are at the core of projects.

Journeys with 'The Waste Land' (2018) 
Tooby's commitment to participation and social engagement is exemplified by his role in, Journeys with 'The Waste Land', a major exhibition exploring the significance of T.S. Eliot’s poem 'The Waste Land' through the visual arts. Tooby described himself as the "initiating curator" of this project, elsewhere he is described as its "architect". Journeys with 'The Waste Land''' was exhibited first at the Turner Contemporary in Margate and then at the Herbert Art Gallery & Museum in Coventry. Information about the project (including its timeline, methodology, downloads, videos of its research group in action and visitor data) is available on the Turner Contemporary Website.

Tooby gave the 2018 Ursula Hoff Lecture in curating at the University of Melbourne. In this lecture, Tooby explored how testimony has played a key role in his recent curatorial projects. His starting point was the use of William Blake's Illustrations to Dante in Journeys with 'The Waste Land', which was created by the collective sharing of different life experiences and expertise by over 100 participants in its curating. He will show how this process was informed by his previous interest in testimony when co-curating faith-based and minority cultural projects in Wales, such as The Muslim World on Your Doorstep and Hineni: belonging and identity in a Jewish community.

 Professional career 
Since 2012, Tooby has been Professor of Art & Design at the Bath School of Art & Design at Bath Spa University. His teaching specialisms are: History of Art & Design; Museology; Contemporary Curatorial Practice.

Previously, Tooby was: curator  (1992 to 1999) at Tate St Ives and curator of the Barbara Hepworth Museum and Sculpture Garden (1992–1999); Director, National Museum & Gallery (2000 to 2004) and Director of Learning, Programmes and Development (2004 to 2011) for Amgueddfa Cymru - National Museum of Wales;

Other recent academic appointments include: Senior Research Fellow (2014–15) at the Henry Moore Institute; Steering Group Member (2015–18) for the Arts and Humanities Research Council funded research project led by Sonia Boyce, "Black Art and Modernism", at the University of the Arts London; Academic Advisor to the Academy of Visual Arts (2015–18), Hong Kong Baptist University; International Visiting Scholar (2018) in the Art History and Curating programme, Australian National University.

 Early life 
Tooby grew up in Coventry and was educated at King Henry VIII School, Coventry (1967 to 1974) before studying for a Master of Arts (MA) in Art History, Archaeology and Anthropology at Magdalene College, Cambridge (1975–78)

 Bibliography 

Full details of Tooby's "research and academic outputs" can be found on ResearchSPAce

 Books 

 Tooby, M, ed. (2018) wavespeech: Edmund de Waal and David Ward - a collaborative work in context Tooby, M and Shalgosky, S, eds. (2015) Imagining a university: fifty years of the University of Warwick Art collection Stair, J and Tooby, M (2014) Julian Stair: Quietus reviewed. Archaeology of an exhibition Tooby, M (2012) Engaging young people in the arts in Norway and Wales. 
 Tooby, M (2005) Trevor Bell: Heatscape, the Florida six, Still: the new paintings Tooby, M and Feary, J (1999) Colour in space: Patrick Heron: public projects Tooby, M and de Waal, E (1999) Modern home: an intervention by Edmund de Waal at High Cross House Tooby, M, Daniel, S and Barlow, M (1995) From the interior: selected sculptures 1981-1995 
 Tooby, M and Shalev, D (1995) Tate Gallery St Ives: the building Tooby, M (1993) Tate Gallery St. Ives, Barbara Hepworth Museum and Sculpture Garden: an illustrated companionTooby, M (1987) 'In Perpetuity and Without Charge': Mappin Art Gallery 1887–1987 Chapters 
 2020: '"Who me?": the individual experience in participative and collaborative projects.', O'Neill, M and Hooper, G, eds. Connecting Museums 2017: 'When forms become attitude: a consideration of the adoption by an artist of ceramic display as narrative device and symbolic landscape.', Petrie, K and Livingstone, A, eds. The Ceramics Reader 2015: 'Veronica Ryan.', Making It: Sculpture in Britain 1977–1986 2015: 'Do not call it fixity.', James Hugonin: binary rhythm: paintings 2010-2015 2014: 'Many-roomed mansion to theatre of memories: thoughts on artists and museums.', Nicol, G, ed. Inspired by: your guide to art and the museum 2013: 'Simplicity and subject.', William Scott: simplicity and subject 2012: 'Look closely.', Kurt Jackson: A New Genre of Landscape Painting 2010: 'Rachel Nicholson: critical view.', Wilkinson, A, ed. Rachel Nicholson 2008: 'The master printer.', Hughes, S, Clark, M and Fitch, A, eds. Hugh Stoneman: master printer 2007: 'St Ives - is it worth saving?', The St Ives School 1997-2007 2006: 'Where does the museum end?', Lang, C, Reeve, J and Woollard, V, eds. The responsive museum: working with audiences in the twenty-first century 2003: 'Trevor Bell.', Trevor Bell: a British painter in America 2001: 'Towards a study of Terry Setch.', Tooby, M and Holman, M, eds. Terry Setch: a retrospective 2000: 'Iwan Bala.', Offerings and reinventions 2000: 'Light the blue touch paper.', Gage, J and Tooby, M, eds. Blue: borrowed and new 2000: 'A working environment.', David Nash: chwarel goed, wood quarry 1998: 'The same subject: sources and origins.', Glennie, S, ed. William Scott: paintings and drawings 1998: 'Peter Randall-Page.', Whistling in the dark: Peter Randall-Page, drawings and prints 1983-98 Journal articles 

 with Scott, T (2016: 'A journey with 'The waste land'.' Arts & Education (8)
 2014: 'Interpreting and learning.' Engage (35)
 2012: 'When forms become attitude: a consideration of the adoption by an artist of ceramic display as narrative device and symbolic landscape'. Behind the Scenes at the Museum: Ceramics in the Expanded Field 2012: 'Order and disorder: Some relationships between ceramics, sculpture and museum taxonomies.' Interpreting Ceramics (14)
 2011: 'Home and away: collections abroad.' Engage (28)
 2010: 'Edmund de Waal: the hare with amber eyes' Interpreting Ceramics (12)
 2009: 'More than skin deep: the new Art Gallery of Ontario.' Museum Practice (45)
 2006: 'St Ives and Cardiff: two experiences of cultural tourism.' Nexus (35)

 Conferences, Lectures and Workshops 

 2019: Julian Stair: Tea and sensation. Summer 2019, co-facilitator, Compton Verney Art Gallery & Park
2018: Modernism, image and text: reflections on T.S.Eliot and visualisation of 'The waste land'. 29 October 2018, Australian National University, Canberra, Australia.
 2018: 'I can connect': the power of curating to share experiences. 18 October 2018, The Ursula Hoff Lecture 2018, University of Melbourne, Australia
 2018: Trevor Bell: his time as Gregory Fellow and its position in the trajectory of the Gregory Fellowships. 14–15 June 2018, University of Leeds, UK.
 2015: Tooby, M, Smith, R and O’ Keeffe, D A journey with T. S. Eliot’s 'The Waste Land' 8 October 2015, Ilkley Literature Festival, Ilkley Playhouse, Ilkley, UK.
 2015: Another side of Stanley Royle. 29 April 2015, Lunchtime Talk Series, Graves Art Gallery, Sheffield, UK.

 Exhibitions 

 2018: Journeys with 'The Waste Land' [curator]. Turner Contemporary, Margate, UK, 3 February - 7 May 2018.
 2015: wavespeech [curator]. The Pier Arts Centre, Stromness, Scotland, 20 June - 12 September 2015.
 2014: Storio - store. Settlement, Spit and Sawdust Skatepark, Cafe and Artspace, Roath, Cardiff, 17 October 2014.
 2013: At the mad shepherdess. Diffusion: Cardiff International Festival of Photography., Chapter, Cardiff, 12–19 May 2013.
 2013: William Scott: Simplicity and Subject. Victoria Art Gallery, Bath, UK, 7 September - 17 November 2013.
 2012: The Museum of Amazing Coincidences. Made in Roath, Cardiff, UK, October 2012.
 2011: Kelvin Road mantelpiece. Made in Roath, Cardiff, 2011.
 2008: National Museum and Gallery, Cardiff: complete redisplay of art galleries, representation of natural history gallery and learning spaces. National Museum Wales, Cardiff, UK, 2008.
 1997: A Quality Of Light: A Collaborative Visual Arts Event.'' Tate Gallery St Ives, May - July 1997

References 

Living people
People from Coventry
English curators
Academics of Bath Spa University
1956 births